The 1850 Vermont gubernatorial election took place on September 3, 1850, and resulted in the election of Whig Party candidate Charles K. Williams to a one-year term as governor.

Results

References

1850
Vermont
Gubernatorial
October 1850 events